Vinci is a European Space Agency cryogenic liquid rocket engine currently under development. It is designed to power the new upper stage of Ariane 6.

Overview
Vinci is an expander cycle rocket engine fed with liquid hydrogen and liquid oxygen. Its biggest improvement from its predecessor, the HM7B (which powers the ESC-A), is the capability of restarting up to five times. It is also the first European expander cycle engine, removing the need for a gas generator to drive the fuel and oxidizer pumps. The engine features a carbon ceramic extendable nozzle in order to have a large, 2.15 m diameter nozzle extension with minimum length: the retracted nozzle part is deployed only after the upper stage separates from the rest of the rocket; after extension, the engine's overall length increases from 2.3 m to 4.2 m.

Development
Although the ESC-B development was put on hold in 2003, the Vinci project was not cancelled: at a lower pace, the engine is still being developed. On 22 December 2006, Snecma announced a new ESA contract for Vinci rocket engine long-duration and re-ignition testing. 

In late April 2010 the German Aerospace Center DLR announced the start of a six-month test campaign for the Vinci engine at its Lampoldshausen facility. The first successful test firing of this campaign took place on 27 May 2010. A video of a test was released in 2016.

In 2014, NASA was interested with the idea of using the Vinci instead of the RL10 for an upper stage of Space Launch System. The Vinci offers the same specific impulse at the same mass but with 64% greater thrust, which would allow for a reduction of one or two of the four second stage engines for the same performance, while the cost would be lower.

As of 2022, the first flight of the Ariane 6 rocket with Vinci is planned for early 2023.

In July 2017, Ariane Group reported that the first flight models of the combustion chamber had entered production.

See also
 Spacecraft propulsion
 M10 (rocket engine)

Comparable engines
 RL10
 RL60
 HM7B
 YF-75D
 RD-0146
 LE-5B-2
 CE-20

References

External links
 ESA news 2005-05-20: Vinci engine hot-firing test a success
 ESA news 2005-06-14: Testing the new Vinci engine
 ESA news 2005-07-29: Thumbs up for 60-second firing
 ESA news 2005-11-07: Second Vinci engine ready for testing

Rocket engines using hydrogen propellant
Rocket engines using the expander cycle